José Gabriel dos Santos Silva (born 21 January 1999), commonly known as Zé Gabriel, is a Brazilian professional footballer, who plays as either a defensive midfielder for Vasco da Gama.

Professional career
Zé Gabriel played at the base of the Corinthians Between 2013 and 2017, and moved to the base of the Internacional in 2018, And for the professional in 2019.  Zé Gabriel made his professional debut for Internacional on 3 August 2019, losing for 2-1 by Fluminense, at the Campeonato Brasileiro Série A.

References

External links
 
 Internacional Profile

1999 births
Living people
Sportspeople from Sergipe
Brazilian footballers
Association football defenders
Association football midfielders
Sport Club Internacional players
CR Vasco da Gama players
Campeonato Brasileiro Série A players